WSBW (105.1 The Goat FM) is a radio station broadcasting a locally programmed variety hits format. Licensed to Ephraim, Wisconsin, United States, the station is currently owned by Bryan Mazur, through licensee Mazur, LLC.

The same call letters were formerly used by another station ( WSBW 99.7 FM ) located in Sturgeon Bay, Wisconsin.

On March 12, 2020, WSBW changed their format from classic country to variety hits, branded as "105.1 The Goat".

References

External links

SBW
Radio stations established in 1989
Adult hits radio stations in the United States